Brigadier-General Sir Douglas Frederick Rawdon Dawson  (25 April 1854 – 20 January 1933) was a British Army general officer and courtier.

Background and education
Dawson was the second son of the Hon. Thomas Vesey Dawson, an officer of the Coldstream Guards who was killed at the Battle of Inkerman. His paternal grandfather was Richard Thomas Dawson, 2nd Baron Cremorne. His elder brother, Vesey, was also a British Army officer.

He attended Eton College, and then joined the Coldstream Guards in 1874, attending the Staff College in 1881.

Military career

Dawson saw service with the Egyptian Campaign of 1882, where he fought at the battles of Mahuta, Kassassin, Tel el-Kebir and the capture of Cairo. In the Nile Expedition of 1884–85, he was part of the Guards' Camel Corps, was mentioned in despatches, and saw action at the Battle of Abu Klea. He was then appointed a Military Attaché from 1895 to 1901, posted to Austria-Hungary, Serbia, France, Belgium and Switzerland, before returning to the United Kingdom in March 1902 to command the 10th Provisional Battalion stationed at Dover The following year he was appointed Master of the Ceremonies to King Edward VII, serving from 1903 to 1907 and then as a Comptroller in the Lord Chamberlain's Department.

On the outbreak of the First World War he received an appointment as Assistant Director of Personal Services at the War Office from 1914 to 1915, and was appointed Inspector of Vulnerable Points at GHQ from 1916 to 1919, in which role he was again mentioned in despatches. After the War, in 1920, he resigned his position as Comptroller and was appointed State Chamberlain, holding the office until 1924.

Awards and honours

Partly as a result of his diplomatic career, he held a number of foreign decorations, including the Iron Crown of Austria (Knight Commander); the Turkish Order of Medjidie (3rd class); the Danish Order of Dannebrog (Grand Cross); the Japanese Grand Cross Sacred Treasure and Grand Cross Rising Sun; the Grand Cross of the Crown of Italy; and the Grand Cross of the Crown of Romania. He served as the Registrar and Secretary to the Order of the Bath, and the Secretary to the Order of the Garter.

Personal life

He married Aimée Evelyn Pirie, formerly Mrs Oakley, in 1903, who was appointed Dame Grand Cross of the Order of the British Empire in 1918. 

Sir Douglas and Lady Aimée Dawson lived at Medmenham Abbey in Buckinghamshire.
Their adopted daughter, Rosemary, married Lieutenant-Colonel Vernon Erskine-Crum; the couple had one son, Brigadier Douglas Erskine Crum.

Dame Aimée Evelyn Dawson died on 24 December 1946, aged 82, at Oxfordshire.

References

1854 births
1933 deaths
People educated at Eton College
Coldstream Guards officers
Douglas
Knights Grand Cross of the Royal Victorian Order
Knights Commander of the Order of the Bath
Companions of the Order of St Michael and St George
British Army personnel of the Anglo-Egyptian War
British Army personnel of the Mahdist War
British Army generals of World War I
People from Buckinghamshire
Place of birth missing
Graduates of the Staff College, Camberley
Place of death missing
British military attachés
British Army brigadiers